The John Curtin Hotel, better known as The Curtin, is a pub, bar, and live music venue located in Carlton, Victoria, Australia.

Founded c1860, the pub was first named The Lygon Hotel and was renamed The John Curtin Hotel in 1971 after Australia's 14th prime minister, John Curtin. It is known as a meeting place for the Labor party, and remained popular among members of the labour movement due to the Victorian Trades Hall building being across the road.

In 1975 the Australian Council of Trades Unions announced plans to buy the building for approximately $500,000 and redevelop it.

The venue was nominated in the Music Victoria Awards category for Best Venue (Under 500 Capacity) in 2016 and 2017.

The building features an upstairs 300 person capacity bandroom, and is currently home to Sonny's Fried Chicken and Burgers, serving American-style food.

In 2020, the pub's owner Ben Russell was forced to close the bandroom and cancel all upcoming gigs due to government restrictions around the COVID-19 pandemic. They continued to serve food and drinks, but he said business had suffered.

In February 2022 the pub's managers announced their lease would expire in November after the owner had decided to sell the building. Beat noted The Curtin's closure and uncertain future was part of an ongoing trend in Melbourne, with many live music venues forced to close.

Following the pub's announcement, unions once again discussed purchasing the building. The sale is being managed by commercial real estate agency CBRE.

The building is protected by the City of Melbourne’s heritage overlay so that it can't be demolished completely. But it can be partially demolished, leaving the original façade and allowing new apartments to be built.

References

External links 

 Official Website
 The John Curtin Hotel on Discogs
 The Curtin's owner Bruno Coruzzi's obituary (2010).
 Photograph of bar c2010

Organisations based in Melbourne
Music venues in Melbourne
Pubs in Melbourne
Buildings and structures in the City of Melbourne (LGA)
1860s establishments in Australia